EV Lacertae (EV Lac, Gliese 873, HIP 112460) is a faint red dwarf star 16.5 light years away in the constellation Lacerta. It is the nearest star to the Sun in that region of the sky, although with an apparent magnitude of 10, it is only barely visible with binoculars. EV Lacertae is spectral type M3.5 flare star that emits X-rays.

On 25 April 2008, NASA's Swift satellite picked up a record-setting flare from EV Lacertae. This flare was thousands of times more powerful than the largest observed solar flare. Because EV Lacertae is much farther from Earth than the Sun, the flare did not appear as bright as a solar flare. The flare would have been visible to the naked eye if the star had been in an observable part of the night sky at the time. It was the brightest flare ever seen from a star other than the Sun.

EV Lacertae is much younger than that of the Sun. Its age is estimated at 300 million years, and it is still spinning rapidly. The fast spin, together with its convective interior, produces a magnetic field much more powerful than that of the Sun. This strong magnetic field is believed to play a role in the star's ability to produce such bright flares. After the flare, the star was blue.

References

Lacerta (constellation)
M-type main-sequence stars
Lacertae, EV
Flare stars
Ursa Major Moving Group
112460
0873